Fernando Coniglio (born 24 November 1991) is an Argentine footballer who plays for Categoría Primera A side Delfín, on loan from Huracán as a forward.

References

External links

1991 births
Living people
Sportspeople from Córdoba Province, Argentina
Association football forwards
Argentine footballers
Argentine expatriate footballers
Footballers at the 2011 Pan American Games
Pan American Games silver medalists for Argentina
Pan American Games medalists in football
Medalists at the 2011 Pan American Games
Rosario Central footballers
Club Atlético Sarmiento footballers
Sportivo Belgrano footballers
Unión de Santa Fe footballers
Chacarita Juniors footballers
Olimpo footballers
Club Atlético Huracán footballers
Club Atlético Lanús footballers
CD Tenerife players
Curicó Unido footballers
San Luis de Quillota footballers
Independiente Santa Fe footballers
Delfín S.C. footballers
Argentine Primera División players
Primera Nacional players
Segunda División players
Chilean Primera División players
Primera B de Chile players
Categoría Primera A players
Argentine expatriate sportspeople in Spain
Argentine expatriate sportspeople in Chile
Argentine expatriate sportspeople in Colombia
Expatriate footballers in Spain
Expatriate footballers in Chile
Expatriate footballers in Colombia